Acrocercops bisinuata is a moth of the family Gracillariidae, known from Sri Lanka and India. The hostplant for the species is Eugenia malaccensis.

References

bisinuata
Moths of Asia
Moths described in 1921